The White Top Railway was chartered as a common carrier in the early 20th century from a portion of the logging lines of the Hassinger Lumber Company in  Washington and  Grayson Counties, Virginia, United States. The move was born of the lumber company's need to protect its rail operations at points of intersection with the Virginia-Carolina Railway from possible condemnation for the V-C's own, expanding line. (Both roads were vying for right-of-way through the narrow confines of the Laurel Creek gorge.)

The length of the WT was a scant 8 miles, covering the distance from the mill in Konnarock to the mountain village of White Top. This mileage represented a small percentage of Hassinger's 75 miles of logging line. The WT was built as a standard gauge line, although a third rail was added for two miles near the mill to accommodate  narrow gauge trains acquired with the purchase of the T.W. Thayer Lumber Co. in 1924. Operations on the WT ceased upon or soon after the closing of the mill on Christmas Eve 1928.

The WT locomotive roster included two Climax and three Shay  geared steam locomotives. WT rolling stock included 20 flat cars; two log loaders; a steam ditcher; a steel flat car; and at least one caboose (seen behind the log loader and at the end of the train in the photo to the left.)

References

Waskiewicz, Fred. "The Hassinger Lumber Company and Its Railroad Operations." National Railway Bulletin. Vol. 52, No. 5, 1987.
Thompson, Dunn and Hauff. The Climax Locomotive. Oso Publishing Co. 2002.
Hirsimaki, Eric. Lima, the History. Hundman Publishing Co. 1986.

Defunct Virginia railroads
Logging railroads in the United States